A technical definition is a definition in technical communication describing or explaining technical terminology. Technical definitions are used to introduce the vocabulary which makes communication in a particular field succinct and unambiguous. For example, the iliac crest from medical terminology is the top ridge of the hip bone (see ilium).

Types of technical definitions
There are three main types of technical definitions.
 Power definitions
 Secondary definitions
 Extended definitions

Examples
Aniline, a benzene ring with an amine group, is a versatile chemical used in many organic syntheses.

The genus Helogale (dwarf mongooses) contains two species.

Secondary definitions
These definitions generally appear in three different places: within the text, in margin notes, or in a glossary. Regardless of position in the document, most sentence definitions follow the basic form of term, category, and distinguishing features.

Examples
A major scale is a diatonic scale which has the semitone interval pattern 2-2-1-2-2-2-1.
 term: major scale
 category: diatonic scales
 distinguishing features: semitone interval pattern 2-2-1-2-2-2-1

In mathematics, an abelian group is a group which is commutative.
 term: abelian group
 category: mathematical groups
 distinguishing features: commutative

Extended definitions
When a term needs to be explained in great detail and precision, an extended definition is used. They can range in size from a few sentences to many pages. Shorter ones are usually found in the text, and lengthy definitions are placed in a glossary.  Relatively complex concepts in mathematics require extended definitions in which mathematical objects are declared (e.g., let x be a real number...) and then restricted by conditions (often signaled by the phrase such that). These conditions often employ the universal and/or existential quantifiers (for all, there exists).   

Note: In mathematical definitions, convention dictates the use of the word if between the term to be defined and the definition; however, definitions should be interpreted as though if and only if were used in place of if.

Examples

References

Technical communication